Purrington is a surname. Notable people with the surname include:

Ben Purrington (born 1996), English footballer
Edward Purrington (1929–2012), American opera director and artistic administrator
Tom Purrington (born 2000), English footballer